Enjoy It While It Lasts is the debut studio album by English indie rock band Spector, released on 13 August 2012. It follows the singles "Chevy Thunder" and "Celestine", which were released on Luv Luv Luv Records during 2012. The album reached number 12 in the UK Albums Chart, and went to number 1 on the Official Record Store Chart on the week of its release.

Critical reception

Upon its release, Enjoy It While It Lasts received mixed reviews. NME praised its harking back to a lost age of "indie disco" akin to the triumvirate of The Killers, The Strokes and Razorlight. Yet from The Guardian there was a sense of disapproval at the seemingly shallow façade of "makeweight chugging alt-rock". Particular attention has been paid to the lyrics, with The Quietus describing "whip-smart words", while according to The Observers Hermione Hoby, they create a "unique blend of hubris and humour." Digital Spy also praised the lyrical work of lead singer Fred MacPherson, commenting "there's a self-deprecating wit to his wordplay that makes Spector all the more bewitching."

Accolades

Track listing

Chart performance

Personnel
 Fred MacPherson – vocals
 Chris Burman – guitar
 Tom Shickle – bass guitar
 Jed Cullen – guitar, synthesizer
 Danny Blandy – drums

References

2012 debut albums
Spector (band) albums
Fiction Records albums